Sequel to the Diamond from the Sky (also known as The Fate of the Child and The Gypsy's Trust) is a 1916 American silent film directed by Edward Sloman starring William Russell and Rhea Mitchell. The film is the sequel to the very popular The Diamond from the Sky. It is now considered to be lost.

Cast
 William Russell as Arthur
 Dodo Newton as Little Arthur
 Rhea Mitchell as Esther Stanley
 Charlotte Burton
 William Tedmarsh
 Orrall Humphrey
 Vivian Marston
 Ward McAllister
 Blair Stanley

References

External links

1916 films
American black-and-white films
Films directed by Edward Sloman
Lost American films
1916 lost films
1910s American films
American silent serial films